Cuba is a city in Republic County, Kansas, United States.  As of the 2020 census, the population of the city was 140.

History

The community was founded in 1868 by American southerners traveling westward after the American Civil War. The city received its name from one settler who had once lived on the island of Cuba. Other early settlers of Cuba are Czech immigrants from Bohemia that settled in Cuba in the mid-1870s. Originally the majority of the population of Cuba were of Czech and Austrian descent.

The entire town of Cuba moved to its present location in 1884 in order to be on the railroad that had been built through that region.

The town has received attention due to its small town America nature documented by photographer Jim Richardson. Cuba, Kansas and Jim Richardson were highlighted on the CBS News Sunday Morning show in 1983 and in 2004, as well as the May 2004 issue of National Geographic magazine.

Geography
Cuba is located at  (39.802222, -97.457128).

Demographics

2010 census
As of the census of 2010, there were 156 people, 79 households, and 48 families residing in the city. The racial makeup of the city was 96.8% White, 1.3% Native American, and 1.9% from two or more races.

There were 79 households, of which 12.7% had children under the age of 18 living with them, 55.7% were married couples living together, 3.8% had a female householder with no husband present, 1.3% had a male householder with no wife present, and 39.2% were non-families. 35.4% of all households were made up of individuals, and 16.5% had someone living alone who was 65 years of age or older. The average household size was 1.97 and the average family size was 2.52.

The median age in the city was 55.8 years. 12.8% of residents were under the age of 18; 5.7% were between the ages of 18 and 24; 11.5% were from 25 to 44; 39.7% were from 45 to 64; and 30.1% were 65 years of age or older. The gender makeup of the city was 51.3% male and 48.7% female.

2000 census
As of the census of 2000, there were 231 people, 110 households, and 72 families residing in the city. The racial makeup of the city was 98.27% White, 0.43% Native American, and 1.30% from two or more races. Hispanic or Latino of any race were 3.03% of the population.

There were 110 households, out of which 23.6% had children under the age of 18 living with them, 58.2% were married couples living together, 5.5% had a female householder with no husband present, and 34.5% were non-families. 33.6% of all households were made up of individuals, and 21.8% had someone living alone who was 65 years of age or older. The average household size was 2.10 and the average family size was 2.67.

In the city, the population was spread out, with 19.0% under the age of 18, 5.6% from 18 to 24, 21.6% from 25 to 44, 24.2% from 45 to 64, and 29.4% who were 65 years of age or older. The median age was 47 years. For every 100 females, there were 94.1 males. For every 100 females age 18 and over, there were 94.8 males.

The median income for a household in the city was $28,333, and the median income for a family was $37,292. Males had a median income of $24,375 versus $17,857 for females. The per capita income for the city was $17,103. About 3.1% of families and 6.8% of the population were below the poverty line, including 8.5% of those under the age of eighteen and 9.1% of those 65 or over.

Government
The Cuba government consists of a mayor and five council members.   The council meets once a month.

Education
The community is served by Republic County USD 109 public school district. It was formed in 2006 by the consolidation of Belleville USD 427 and Hillcrest USD 455. The Republic County High School mascot is Republic County Buffaloes.

Hillcrest (Cuba) schools were closed through school unification. The Hillcrest High School mascot was Hillcrest Mustangs.

References

Further reading

External links

 City of Cuba
 Cuba - Directory of Public Officials
 Cuba city map, KDOT

Austrian-American history
Cities in Kansas
Czech-American culture in Kansas
Cities in Republic County, Kansas
Populated places established in 1868
1868 establishments in Kansas